Cooper Webb (born November 10, 1995) is an American professional motocross and supercross racer. He has competed in the AMA Motocross Championships since 2013, most prominently as a two-time Supercross champion for the KTM factory racing team. He won the 2019 and 2021 450cc AMA Supercross Championship, the 2016 250cc AMA Motocross national champion and was the 2015 and 2016 western region supercross champion.

Being outspoken and hard-nosed, Webb embodies many of the traits of riders from the early era of the sport. Ricky Carmichael has described him as "a warrior and a fighter". He runs plate number 2 shared by other notables such as Jeremy McGrath and Ryan Villopoto.

Motocross career
Webb was born in Newport, North Carolina where his father Robert a professional surfer raced motocross in the 70s. He competed in his first motocross race at the age of 4 at the Kinley MX. His first amateur championship came at age 6 riding a Yamaha PW50. He was named the youth motocrosser of the year in 2010. Webb began his professional motocross career at the age of 17 with the Yamaha factory racing team in 2013. He won his first AMA National race on June 28, 2014, in the 250 cc class at the Muddy Creek Raceway in Blountville, Tennessee and, was named the 2014 Monster Energy Supercross Rookie of the Year.

Webb won the 2015 250SX Western Regional supercross championship. The following season he successfully defended his 250SX Western Regional championship and also won the 2016 250cc AMA Motocross Championship, becoming the 11th winner of back-to-back titles and a winning percentage of 42% (11 wins / 26 starts).

He won the 2019 450cc AMA Supercross Championship, the 2016 250cc AMA Motocross national champion and was the 2015 and 2016 western region supercross champion.

Webb was also the team captain for the American 2016 Motocross des Nations team that finished as runner-up to the French team. He moved up to the 450cc class in 2017 before joining the KTM factory racing team in 2019. He trains alongside Marvin Musquin and Zach Osborne under the stewardship of professional motocross trainer Aldon Baker.

2019
After switching to team Red Bull KTM, Webb won the 2019 Supercross title.

2020
Despite a near season ending crash at Arlington, TX, that took him out of the 2020 outdoor season, Webb rallied to finish 2nd behind Eli Tomac in the 2020 supercross points standings.

2021
In 2021, Webb won his second 450SX supercross championship.

On June 22, ESPN announced the full list of the 2021 ESPY Award nominations across all eligible categories. After Webb's second supercross championship, he was nominated for his first ESPY Award in the Best Athlete, Men's Action Sports Category.

AMA Supercross/Motocross results

Notes

References 

Living people
1995 births
People from Morehead City, North Carolina
American motocross riders
AMA Motocross Championship National Champions